The England–Ireland football rivalry is a rivalry between England and Republic of Ireland football teams. The first ever match was played on 30 September 1946 at Dalymount Park, Dublin. England won the match 1–0. On 21 September 1949, Republic of Ireland won the second match 2–0 which was played at Goodison Park, Liverpool and became the first foreign team to defeat England at their home soil.

Since then there have a been a total of 16 matches between both the teams with England and Republic of Ireland winning six and two matches respectively and eight games ended in a draw.

History
England and Ireland has a long-standing rivalry, stretching back to Anglo-Norman invasion of Ireland, when settlers started to control Irish affairs, British colonising the Irish Island and displacing the locals and with the Plantation of Ulster, the Catholic (local) majority was under the control of the Protestant minority settlers. After the Irish War of Independence, the British divided Ireland into two self-governing polities; which later became Northern Ireland and the Republic of Ireland. The split caused animosity between England and the Republic of Ireland which can be often seen when the countries meet in any sporting events.

Within football, England and Ireland began playing against one another regularly from the early 1880s, but this was the Ireland team organised by the Irish Football Association based in Belfast which favoured Ulster Protestant players; as participants in the British Home Championship, their relationship with England was fraternal. That Ireland team eventually evolved into the current Northern Ireland national football team, whereas the  Republic of Ireland national football team formed in 1921 by the Football Association of Ireland in Dublin had no such sporting familiarity with England (although it was always the case that the majority of the best Irish players were based there) and clear differences in cultural and political leanings amongst their supporters.

The rivalry is further intensified when Irish-born or descendant players switch allegiances to England, with Declan Rice and Jack Grealish being the latest examples, as both represented Republic of Ireland from U16 to U21 levels, then switched to England at senior level. Rice made three appearances for the Republic of Ireland before joining England.

List of matches

Statistics

All-time top goalscorers

All-time most appearances

Overall

References

England national football team rivalries
International association football rivalries
Ireland–United Kingdom relations
England at the 1990 FIFA World Cup
England at UEFA Euro 1988
Republic of Ireland at the 1990 FIFA World Cup
Republic of Ireland at UEFA Euro 1988